Bean is a village and civil parish in the Borough of Dartford, Kent, England. It is located 4.4 miles south east of Dartford and 5.4 miles south west of Gravesend.

The Area
The parish is bounded on the north by the A2 road (the Roman Watling Street), and on the other three sides by ancient woodlands. It is the most recently formed of Kent parishes, although the village itself has been recorded since at least the 13th century. Bean was formerly part of the parish of Stone, but the boundary was such that it was connected to the rest of Stone by only a narrow neck of land at Watling Street (A2). In 1797 this part of the parish of Stone is described as having great tract of woodland which reached almost to Green Street Green, adjoining to Darenth parish. Along the northern boundary of these woods, runs the ancient Roman road to Rochester (now the A2) and not far from this road were the two small hamlets of Bean and Stonewood. On the hill above Green Street Green, among the woods, were the remains of a camp and fortifications, thrown up in ancient times, but then so overgrown with wood and rubbish, as to be impenetrable.

Transport

Rail
The nearest National Rail stations to Bean are Longfield, located 2.2 miles away and Greenhithe, located 2.4 miles away.

Buses
Bean is served by Go Coach's Connect1 bus service, connecting it with Bluewater.

Notes

External links
Notes on Bean parish

Villages in Kent
Borough of Dartford
Civil parishes in Kent